The county of Cheshire is divided into four unitary authorities: Cheshire West and Chester, Cheshire East, Warrington, and Halton.

As there are 390 Grade II* listed buildings in the county, they have been split into separate lists for each unitary authority.

 Grade II* listed buildings in Cheshire West and Chester
 Grade II* listed buildings in Cheshire East
 Grade II* listed buildings in Warrington
 Grade II* listed buildings in Halton (borough)

See also
 Grade I listed buildings in Cheshire